Isaac Pursell (June 1853 – August 9, 1910) was a Philadelphia, Pennsylvania-based architect.

He was born at Trenton, New Jersey in 1853 and attended public schools.  He received architectural training in the Philadelphia offices of Samuel Sloan.  He was a prolific designer of churches located in the eastern United States. Many of his church designs reflect the English Gothic Revival style.  In Philadelphia, he designed the Christ Reformed Church at Chester and 43rd Street; St. Matthews' Lutheran; St.
Paul's Reformed Episcopal; The Calvary Methodist in Germantown (1892); St. Paul's Presbyterian; Moravian Church
of the Holy Trinity (1879); Bethany Tabernacle, and Christ Protestant Episcopal.

He died at his home in Wenonah, New Jersey on August 9, 1910, and is buried in Wenonah Cemetery.

Selected works
 1883: Tygarts Valley Church, Huttonsville, West Virginia, listed on the National Register of Historic Places in 1986.
 1887: Makemie Memorial Presbyterian Church, Snow Hill, Maryland, listed on the National Register of Historic Places in 2008.
 1890: St. John's Episcopal Church (Charleston, West Virginia), Charleston, West Virginia, listed on the National Register of Historic Places in 1989.
 1896: Third Presbyterian Church, Chester, Pennsylvania
 1911: Hill Crest Community Center, Clinton, Indiana, listed on the National Register of Historic Places in 1997.
Also designed Christ Memorial Church (1887) at 4233-4257 Chestnut Street in the West Philadelphia Streetcar Suburb Historic District, listed on the National Register of Historic Places in 1998.

Gallery

References

External links
Seventh Annual Endangered Properties List, Preservation Matters: The Newsletter of The Preservation Alliance for Greater Philadelphia, Winter 2010
CHRIST CHURCH COMPLEX, 76 Franklin Avenue, Staten Island, New York City Landmarks Preservation Commission, August 10, 2010

1853 births
1910 deaths
Artists from Trenton, New Jersey
19th-century American architects
Architects from Pennsylvania
Burials in New Jersey
People from Wenonah, New Jersey